Emil Henry "Reggie" Richter (September 14, 1888 – August 2, 1934) was a Major League Baseball pitcher who played for the Chicago Cubs in 1911.

External links

Chicago Cubs players
1888 births
1934 deaths
Major League Baseball players from Germany
Louisville Colonels (minor league) players
Montreal Royals players
Newark Indians players
German emigrants to the United States